Lü Fang is a fictional character in Water Margin, one of the Four Great Classical Novels in Chinese literature. Nicknamed "Little Marquis of Wen", he ranks 54th among the 108 Stars of Destiny and 18th among the 72 Earthly Fiends.

Background
Lü Fang, a native of Tanzhou (around present-day Changsha, Hunan), usually wears a suit of red armour and a silk belt over a flowery robe as well as a knot-like headdress topped with a long feather. He rides a red horse and fights with a ji, resembling Lü Bu of the Three Kingdoms era whose horse is named Red Hare for its colour and whose weapon called "Sky Piercer" was a ji. Due to his many similarities with Lü Bu, Lü Fang is nicknamed "Little Marquis of Wen", the Marquis of Wen being Lü Bu's highest official title.

A trader in medicine, Lü Fang suffers losses while doing business in Shandong and could not afford the journey home. He becomes a bandit chief at one of the two facing hills of Mount Duiying or Mount Mirror Image. He becomes famous in the region after defeating many who come to duel with him. When Guo Sheng, who also fights with a ji, hears of Lü Fang, he comes to Mount Duiying to challenge him to determine who is more worthy of the weapon. As neither could win, the engagement goes on and off for days.

Joining Liangshan
Song Jiang, Hua Rong and the outlaws of Mount Qingfeng pass by Mount Duiying as they head to join Liangshan Marsh after causing mayhem at Qingzhou including routing a government army. They come upon the duel between Guo Sheng and Lü Fang. It happens that the tassels of the two ji get tangled together. The two fighters struggle but could not free their weapons. Seeing that, Hua Rong fires an arrow that hits the tangled point and separates the weapons. Everyone present cheers. Guo and Lü stop their fight and come to greet Hua and his group. Upon learning that the group is going to Liangshan, both want in and are accepted.

Campaigns and death 
After the 108 Stars of Destiny came together in what is called the Grand Assembly, Lü Fang, together with Guo Sheng, is appointed as the guardian of the central camp. That means they are personal bodyguards of Song Jiang. Lü Fang participates in the campaigns against the Liao invaders and rebel forces in Song territory following amnesty by Emperor Huizong for Liangshan.

In the battle of Black Dragon Ridge (烏龍嶺; northeast of present-day Meicheng Town, Jiande, Zhejiang) in the campaign against Fang La, Lü Fang encounters an enemy officer Bai Qin. After an inconclusive fight, they discard their weapons and grapple with each other on horseback. Both fall off the cliff to their deaths.

Notes

References
 
 
 
 
 
 
 

72 Earthly Fiends
Fictional characters from Hunan